Fagonia cretica  is a species of plant in the caltrop family (Zygophyllaceae). It is native to dry regions of the Mediterranean Basin in North Africa (in Cape Verde, Canary Islands, Morocco, Algeria, Tunisia, Libya and Egypt), Southern Europe (in the Balearic Islands, Portugal, Southeast Spain, Sicily, and Greece) and West Asia (in Saudi Arabia and the Sinai peninsula).

Fagonia cretica is a plant of rocky coastlines. It is a creeping plant and has star-shaped, 5-narrow petal, violet to light violet flowers.

Properties
The plant has a sweet, bitter, sharp and sour taste according to different stages of growth and parts. The flowers are purple. The plant has a large number of small fruits near the thorns.

References

External links
"University of the Balearic Islands" Species analysis-Fagonia cretica — herbarivirtual.uib.es

cretica
Flora of the Balearic Islands
Flora of Spain
Flora of North Africa
Plants described in 1753
Taxa named by Carl Linnaeus
Flora of Malta